Ray St. Germain OM (born 1940) is a Canadian musician, author, and radio show host. He was the 2006 federal Liberal candidate for the Winnipeg Centre constituency and the presenter for the 1969 Canadian variety television series Time for Living. He was inducted into the Canadian Country Music Hall of Honour by the Canadian Country Music Association in September 2010. In 2005, St. Germain released his autobiography, "I Wanted to Be Elvis, So What Was I Doing in Moose Jaw?".

St. Germain wrote, produced, and hosted the nationally syndicated, award-winning, Big Sky Country that aired for 13 years on Global Television. He also worked with The Aboriginal Peoples Television Network (APTN), producing and hosting the series Rhythms of the Métis. He is also a voice actor for the children's series Tipi Tales that airs on the Treehouse Network and APTN.

St. Germain has hosted over 600 television shows on CBC Television, Global Television Network, and APTN. He has been an on-air personality and program manager with NCI-FM Radio for seven years and hosts a program called the Métis Hour X2 on Saturday mornings for the Manitoba Métis Federation. St. Germain has entertained Canadian Forces stationed overseas with concerts in Germany, Israel, and Cyprus.

St. Germain has received awards for his contributions to Canadian culture, including the Order of Manitoba, Aboriginal Order of Canada, the Order of the Sash – Saskatoon and Prince Albert, and a position on the Aboriginal Wall of Honour in the Winnipeg Friendship Centre. St. Germain was inducted into the Canadian Country Music Hall of Fame in 2010.

Discography

Albums

Singles

References

2005 INDUCTEE: Ray St. Germain. NCI - FM radio.  Retrieved on 2007-01-03
Ray St. Germain: "The Road Show". NCI - FM radio.  Retrieved on 2007-01-03

1940 births
Canadian television hosts
Métis politicians
Canadian country singers
Métis musicians
Métis writers
Living people
Canadian rockabilly musicians
Musicians from Winnipeg
Writers from Winnipeg
Canadian Métis people
People from St. Vital, Winnipeg